Drillham is a rural town and locality in the Western Downs Region, Queensland, Australia.

Geography 

History 
The town was established in 1878 to service the railway and was home to a camp for workers building the bridge over nearby Drillham Creek. Drillham Post Office opened by June 1910 (a receiving office had been open from 1895). The town and the creek were originally known as 'Delerium' due to the typhoid fever that struck this camp.

Drillham Provisional School opened on 28 Aug 1899, becoming Drillham State School on 1 January 1909.

At the  Drillham and the surrounding area had a population of 217.

In the  Drillham had a population of 126 people.

1893 Drillham Creek tragedy
Four children from the same family died on 15 January 1893 when they were all accidentally drowned in Drillham Creek. Matilda Roehrig (aged 14), Isabella Roehrig (aged 12), Charles Roehrig (aged 11) and Jane Roehrig (aged 8) were the children of railway lengthsman Charles Roehrig and his wife Matilda.  The news of the children's deaths was widely reported in newspapers around Australia. The site where the children's bodies were buried is located alongside the creek beside the Warrego Highway and is marked with a small monument with a commemorative plaque which was unveiled by the Miles and District Historical Society on 23 July 1966.

Economy 
Drillham is a centre for the production of livestock and grains.

Education 
Drillham State School is a government primary (Prep-6) school for boys and girls at 13 Jardine Street. In 2016, the school had an enrolment of 29 students with 3 teachers (2 equivalent full-time) and 4 non-teaching staff (2 equivalent full-time). In 2018, the school had an enrolment of 33 students with 4 teachers (3 full-time equivalent) and 5 non-teaching staff (3 full-time equivalent).

There is no secondary school in Drillham. The nearest secondary school is Miles State High School in neighbouring Miles to the east.

References

External links 

 

Towns in Queensland
Populated places established in 1878
Towns in the Darling Downs
1878 establishments in Australia
Western Downs Region
Localities in Queensland